The Politburo of the 26th Congress of the Communist Party of the Soviet Union was in session from 1981 to 1986.

Composition

Members

Candidates

References

Politburo of the Central Committee of the Communist Party of the Soviet Union members
1981 establishments in the Soviet Union
1986 disestablishments in the Soviet Union